The 1992 Arizona State Sun Devils football team was an American football team that represented Arizona State University in the Pacific-10 Conference (Pac-10) during the 1992 NCAA Division I-A football season. In their first season under head coach Bruce Snyder, the Sun Devils compiled a 6–5 record (4–4 against Pac-10 opponents), finished in a tie for sixth place in the Pac-10, and outscored their opponents by a combined total of 235 to 185.

The team's statistical leaders included Grady Benton with 1,707 passing yards, Jerone Davison with 734 rushing yards, and Eric Guliford with 506 receiving yards.

Schedule

Roster

References

Arizona State
Arizona State Sun Devils football seasons
Arizona State Sun Devils football